The following article outlines statistics for UEFA Euro 1996, which took place in England from 8 to 30 June 1996. Goals scored during penalty shoot-outs are not counted, and matches decided by a penalty shoot-out are counted as draws.

Goalscorers

Discipline
Sanctions against foul play at UEFA Euro 1996 are in the first instance the responsibility of the referee, but when he deems it necessary to give a caution, or dismiss a player, UEFA keeps a record and may enforce a suspension. Referee decisions are generally seen as final.  However, UEFA's disciplinary committee may additionally penalise players for offences unpunished by the referee.

Overview

Red cards
A player receiving a red card is automatically suspended for the next match.  A longer suspension is possible if the UEFA disciplinary committee judges the offence as warranting it. In keeping with the FIFA Disciplinary Code (FDC) and UEFA Disciplinary Regulations (UDR), UEFA does not allow for appeals of red cards except in the case of mistaken identity. The FDC further stipulates that if a player is sent off during his team's final Euro 1996 match, the suspension carries over to his team's next competitive international(s). For Euro 1996 these were the qualification matches for the 1998 FIFA World Cup.

Any player who was suspended due to a red card that was earned in Euro 1996 qualifying was required to serve the balance of any suspension unserved by the end of qualifying either in the Euro 1996 finals (for any player on a team that qualified, whether he had been selected to the final squad or not) or in World Cup qualifying (for players on teams that did not qualify).

Yellow cards
Any player receiving a single yellow card during two of the three group stage matches plus the quarter-final match was suspended for the next match. A single yellow card does not carry over to the semi-finals. This means that no player will be suspended for final unless he gets sent off in semi-final or he is serving a longer suspension for an earlier incident. Suspensions due to yellow cards will not carry over to the World Cup qualifiers. Yellow cards and any related suspensions earned in the Euro 1996 qualifiers are neither counted nor enforced in the final tournament.

In the event a player is sent off for two bookable offences, only the red card is counted for disciplinary purposes.  However, in the event a player receives a direct red card after being booked in the same match, then both cards are counted.  If the player was already facing a suspension for two tournament bookings when he was sent off, this would result in separate suspensions that would be served consecutively.  The one match ban for the yellow cards would be served first unless the player's team is eliminated in the match in which he was sent off.  If the player's team is eliminated in the match in which he was serving his ban for the yellow cards, then the ban for the sending off would be carried over to the World Cup qualifiers.

Additional punishment
For serious transgressions, a longer suspension may be handed down at the discretion of the UEFA disciplinary committee. The disciplinary committee is also charged with reviewing any incidents that were missed by the officials and can award administrative red cards and suspensions accordingly. However, just as appeals of red cards are not considered, the disciplinary committee is also not allowed to review transgressions that were already punished by the referee with something less than a red card. For example, if a player is booked but not sent off for a dangerous tackle, the disciplinary committee cannot subsequently deem the challenge to be violent conduct and then upgrade the card to a red. However, if the same player then spits at the opponent but is still not sent off, then the referee's report would be unlikely to mention this automatic red card offence. Video evidence of the spitting incident could then be independently reviewed.

Unlike the rules in many domestic competitions, there is no particular category of red card offence that automatically results in a multi-game suspension. In general however, extended bans are only assessed for red cards given for serious foul play, violent conduct, spitting or perhaps foul and abusive language. Also, unlike many sets of domestic rules second and subsequent red cards also do not automatically incur an extended ban, although a player's past disciplinary record (including prior competition) might be considered by the disciplinary committee when punishing him. As a rule, only automatic red card offenses are considered for longer bans. A player who gets sent off for picking up two yellow cards in the same match will not have his automatic one-match ban extended by UEFA on account of what he did to get the second booking, because the referee has deemed him as not to have committed an automatic red card offense.

If UEFA suspends a player after his team's elimination from the tournament, or for more games than the team ends up playing without him prior to the final or their elimination (whichever comes first), then the remaining suspension must be served during World Cup qualifying. For a particularly grave offence UEFA has the power to impose a lengthy ban against the offender.

By individual

Red cards
Seven red cards were shown over the course of the tournament's 31 matches, an average of 0.23 red cards per match.

1 red card
  Petar Hubchev
  Igor Štimac
  Radoslav Látal
  Thomas Strunz
  Luigi Apolloni
  Yuri Kovtun
  Juan Antonio Pizzi

Yellow cards
153 yellow cards were shown over the course of the tournament's 31 matches, an average of 4.94 yellow cards per match

By referee

By team

References

Statistics
1996